Neocoenyra is a genus of Afrotropical butterflies from the subfamily Satyrinae in the family Nymphalidae.

Species
Neocoenyra bioculata  Carcasson, 1964
Neocoenyra cooksoni  Druce, 1907
Neocoenyra duplex  Butler, [1886]
Neocoenyra fuligo  Kielland, 1990
Neocoenyra fulleborni  Thurau, 1903
Neocoenyra gregorii  Butler, 1894
Neocoenyra heckmanni  Thurau, 1903
Neocoenyra jordani  Rebel, 1906
Neocoenyra kivuensis  Seydel, 1929
Neocoenyra masaica  Carcasson, 1958
Neocoenyra paralellopupillata  (Karsch, 1897)
Neocoenyra petersi  Kielland, 1990
Neocoenyra pinheyi  Carcasson, 1961
Neocoenyra rufilineata  Butler, 1894
Neocoenyra ypthimoides  Butler, 1894

External links 
 "Neocoenyra Butler, [1886]" at Markku Savela's Lepidoptera and Some Other Life Forms
Seitz, A. Die Gross-Schmetterlinge der Erde 13: Die Afrikanischen Tagfalter. Plate XIII 29

Satyrini
Butterfly genera
Taxa named by Arthur Gardiner Butler